Leucoma nigrolineata is a moth of the  family Erebidae. It is found in Cameroon and the Democratic Republic of Congo (Orientale, East Kasai).

The wingspan is about 57 mm. Both wings are pure white, the forewings with a waved black line in the fold from the base to the termen. Veins four, six, seven and the short branch of vein eight are outlined with black. The costa is black. The hindwings have a very short dark dash at the end of veins four and seven, and a black dot at the end of vein six.

References

Moths described in 1927
Lymantriinae